Hendrik Winegar House was a historic home located at Amenia in Dutchess County, New York.  The structure was demolished after decades of neglect.  It was built about 1761 and is a -story, rectangular house on a high basement built of thick fieldstone and brick walls.  It had a steeply pitched gable roof.  It was coated in stucco applied about 1850.

It was added to the National Register of Historic Places in 1975.

References

Houses on the National Register of Historic Places in New York (state)
Houses completed in 1761
Houses in Dutchess County, New York
National Register of Historic Places in Dutchess County, New York